This is a list of seasons completed by the Stony Brook Seawolves men's basketball team since the team's formation in 1960. The team originally competed at the Division III before being elevated to Division I in 1999. Stony Brook reached the NCAA Tournament for the first time in 2016.

Season-by-season results 

 
Stony Brook Seawolves
Stony Brook Seawolves basketball seasons